This is a list of the prime ministers of Canada by date and place of birth. Twenty–three persons have served as Prime Minister of Canada since the office came into existence in 1867.

Born in Canada

Nineteen of Canada's prime ministers have been born in Canada.

Born outside Canada
Four of Canada's prime ministers have been born outside Canada.

Map

See also
 Fathers of Confederation

Sources
Government of Canada.  Library of Parliament.  "Prime Ministers of Canada". Retrieved September 3, 2016.

Birth
Birthplaces
Lists of prime ministers by place of birth